Itteville is a commune in the Essonne department in Île-de-France in northern France.

Itteville's twin town has been Newick in the United Kingdom since 1988.

Origin of the town name
The original name of the commune comes from the Latin Ittae Villa meaning "Itte farm" referring to Itta of Nivelles, spouse of Pépin de Landen who built a farm. The commune was created in 1793 under the name of Itterville. The current orthography was introduced in 1801 in the law bulletin.

Geographical situation
The Juine forms the commune's northwestern and northern borders, then flows into the Essonne, which forms the commune's eastern border.

Population
Inhabitants of Itteville are known as Ittevillois in French.

See also
 Communes of the Essonne department

References

External links

Official website 

Mayors of Essonne Association 
 website 

Communes of Essonne